NAAR may refer to
 National Alliance for Autism Research, merged with Autism Speaks
 National Assembly Against Racism